Robert Coulter  (23 October 1929 – 5 September 2018) was a Northern Irish politician, a member of the Ulster Unionist Party and a prominent proponent of unionism.

Between 1998 and 2011 he served as an Ulster Unionist Party MLA for North Antrim. Coulter was born in 1929, making him the second oldest MLA after the Rev. Ian Paisley.

He was educated at Ballymena College, Trinity College, Dublin and the University of Ulster.

He was married with one son and one daughter. He was a retired Presbyterian minister and a former lecturer in religious studies at Belfast Institute for Further and Higher Education.

He was elected a Councillor for Ballymena Borough Council in 1985 and was Mayor of Ballymena from 1993 to 1996.

Coulter was elected Alderman of the Borough of Ballymena in 1996.

He was elected to represent the constituency of North Antrim in the Northern Ireland Forum for Political Dialogue (1996–1998)

He was a member of the Health, Social Service and Public Safety Committee in the 1998-2003 Assembly.

Coulter was re-elected to his Assembly seat in 2007.

In 2010, the Reverend Dr. Robert Coulter was honoured for his public service with membership in the Civil Division of the Most Excellent Order of the British Empire.

Coulter did not put his name forward for the 2011 election in North Antrim, effectively retiring. He was in his 80s. He died on 5 September 2018.

References

External links
 NIA expense profile

2018 deaths
1929 births
Alumni of Trinity College Dublin
Alumni of Ulster University
Ulster Unionist Party MLAs
Members of the Northern Ireland Forum
Northern Ireland MLAs 1998–2003
Northern Ireland MLAs 2003–2007
Northern Ireland MLAs 2007–2011
Members of Ballymena Borough Council
Members of the Order of the British Empire
Presbyterian ministers from Northern Ireland
People from Ballymena
Mayors of places in Northern Ireland